Arpalık can refer to:

 Arpalik
 Arpalık, Çorum